Eliezer Isaac Schapira (6 November 1835 – March 1915) was a Jewish Polish writer, translator, and publisher.

Biography
Eliezer Isaac Schapira was born in 1835 in Sereje, Suwałki Governorate, and studied at the yeshiva of Sejny before moving to Augustów to study with his uncle, a rabbi in that city. Under the influence of his relative , he became a Hebrew teacher and a proponent of the Haskalah.

In 1874, Schapira settled in Warsaw, where he opened the first publishing house for children's and young people's Hebrew literature. He would become the main publisher and distributor of the works of Judah Leib Gordon. He meanwhile contributed his own articles and translations to Ha-Maggid, Ha-Tsfira, Ha-Melitz, Ha-Yom, and Ha-Asif, and for a time edited the periodical .

Selected publications
 
  Collection of translated stories.
 
 
 
  Translation of Salomon Kohn's novel Gallerie der Sippurim.

References

1835 births
1915 deaths
19th-century Polish Jews
19th-century publishers (people)
19th-century short story writers
Book publishers (people)
Hebrew-language writers
Jewish Polish writers
People from Suwałki Governorate
People of the Haskalah
Polish children's writers
Polish male short story writers
Polish publishers (people)
Translators from German
Translators to Hebrew
German–Hebrew translators